The Kandawgyi Gardens (also known as Mandalay Kandawgyi Gardens) is a major park in Mandalay, Myanmar. The park consists of over 700 acres (283 hectares) of Kandawgyi Lake and 96 acres (39 hectares) of land area.

References

Mandalay